, also known as Sumiyoshi Grand Shrine, is a Shinto shrine in Sumiyoshi-ku, Osaka, Osaka Prefecture, Japan. It is the main shrine of all the Sumiyoshi shrines in Japan. However, the oldest shrine that enshrines the Sumiyoshi sanjin, the three Sumiyoshi kami, is the Sumiyoshi Shrine in Hakata.

It is called Sumiyoshi-san or Sumiyossan by the locals, and is famous for the large crowds that come to the shrine on New Year's Day for hatsumōde.

Sumiyoshi taisha enshrines the Sumiyoshi sanjin (Sokotsutsu no Ono-mikoto, Nakatsutsu no Ono-mikoto, and Uwatsutsu no Ono-mikoto) (collectively known as the "Sumiyoshi Ōkami") and Okinagatarashi-hime no Mikoto (Empress Jingū).

It gives its name to a style of shrine architecture known as Sumiyoshi-zukuri.

History
The shrine became the object of Imperial patronage during the early Heian period. In 965, Emperor Murakami ordered that Imperial messengers were sent to report important events to the guardian kami of Japan. These heihaku were initially presented to 16 shrines including Sumiyoshi.

Sumiyoshi was designated as the chief Shinto shrine (ichinomiya) for the former Settsu Province.

Sumiyoshi kami and Empress Jingū 
Sumiyoshi taisha was founded by Tamomi no Sukune in the 11th year of Empress Jingū's reign (year 211). A member of a powerful family in the area, he was given the clan name of Owari by the empress when she visited the coast of the Gokishichidō (Modern Shichidou in Sakai, Osaka). At the same time, she told him to enshrine the Sumiyoshi sanjin, as she had been told to do so by an oracle from Amaterasu and three Sumiyoshi kami. Later, the Empress herself was also enshrined at Sumiyoshi. The Tsumori clan, whose members have succeeded the position of head priest of Sumiyoshi taisha since the reign of Emperor Ōjin, are the descendants of Tamomi no Sukune's son, Tsumori no Toyoada (or Tsumori no Toyonogodan).

Other kami
Sumiyoshi taisha is also regarded as the ancestor shrine of Hachiman, the god of war, as the shrine enshrines Empress Jingū, who was the mother of Emperor Ōjin, who was deified as Hachiman. Therefore, the shrine is guardian of the Kawachi bloodline of the Minamoto clan. Also, Hachiman is the god of war on land, and the Sumiyoshi gods are the gods of war on the sea. Later, Sumiyoshi-taisha became one of the three kami of waka.

Yamato Diplomacy and the Silk Road
Sumiyoshi-taisha is a shrine with connections to the ancient Yamato royalty's diplomacy and sailing, protecting the Imperial embassies to China. As the head priests, the Tsumori clan also boarded these embassy ships. The embassies departed from Suminoe no Tsu, a port on the Hosoe-gawa (also known as Hosoi-gawa. Known as Suminoe no Hosoe in ancient times), a river located to the south of the shrine. Suminoe no Tsu is the oldest international port in Japan, and was opened by Emperor Nintoku. It was the Silk Road's entrance into Japan.

Cultural references
Although Sumiyoshi taisha is currently completely landlocked, until the Edo period, the shrine riding grounds (currently Sumiyoshi Park) faced the sea and were considered the representative of the beautiful "hakushaseishou" (white sand and green pines) landscape. So much so that this type of scenery in designs and art is known as the Sumiyoshi design.

In Murasaki Shikibu's The Tale of Genji, the shrine is used as an important stage in some chapters concerning the Akashi Lady.

In the folktale "Issun-bōshi", an old couple who had no children prayed at Sumiyoshi taisha. Their prayers were granted. When their child went on a voyage, he departed at Sumiyoshi harbor, sailed down Hosoe-gawa to Osaka Bay, sailed up the Yodo River, and entered Kyoto.

Notable architecture

Construction style

The honden is built in the Sumiyoshi-zukuri style and has been designated a national treasure on the grounds that it is the oldest example of this style of architecture.

There is an  a forked finial, on the roof of the main shrine, as well as 5 square , billets placed horizontally along the length of the roof. There are no corridors around the sanctuary.

The pillars are round, and stand on stone foundations. The planks between the pillars are horizontal. The area seen from front is the nave, and beyond is the inner shrine and second room.

Sumiyoshi Torii

It is unusual in that the middle bar does not extend outside of the vertical posts, and all pieces have square edges. This type of torii is called Sumiyoshi torii after the shrine.

See also
 List of Shinto shrines
 Twenty-Two Shrines
 Modern system of ranked Shinto Shrines

Notes

References
 Breen, John and Mark Teeuwen. (2000).  Shinto in History: Ways of the Kami. Honolulu: University of Hawaii Press. 
 Ponsonby-Fane, Richard. (1962).   Studies in Shinto and Shrines. Kyoto: Ponsonby Memorial Society. OCLC 399449
 . (1959).  The Imperial House of Japan. Kyoto: Ponsonby Memorial Society. OCLC 194887

External links

Official site
Festivals - Official movies

Shinto shrines in Osaka
211 establishments
National Treasures of Japan
Important Cultural Properties of Japan
Beppyo shrines
Kanpei-taisha